The 1984 Oregon Ducks football team represented the University of Oregon in the 1984 NCAA Division I-A football season. Playing as a member of the Pacific-10 Conference (Pac-10), the team was led by head coach Rich Brooks, in his eighth year, and played their home games at Autzen Stadium in Eugene, Oregon. They finished the season with a record of six wins and five losses (6–5 overall,  in the

Schedule

References

Oregon
Oregon Ducks football seasons
Oregon Ducks football